Broderick Hunter Jr. (born January 3, 1991), is an American model and actor from Fontana, California.

Early life
Broderick Hunter Jr. was born on January 3, 1991, in Fontana, California to Broderick Hunter Sr. and Chika Hunter. He has an older sister, Jole. He attended Etiwanda High School, where he played basketball, which eventually led him to a scholarship for University of Central Florida.

Career
Hunter started his modeling career in 2011 at age of 20, after being asked to become a model for a photoshoot. He has since starred in editorials for various publications, including Cosmopolitan, Maxim, Essence, Vogue Paris and Italian GQ, and has also been featured on the covers of XIOX, Fantastics and OnFitness magazines. Publications, such as Business Insider, People and Harper's Bazaar, have featured him on their list of "sexiest men on Instagram". Additionally, Hunter has been the face of Ralph Lauren Corporation and landed a campaign with Icelandic Glacial in 2017.

Acting
In 2011, Hunter appeared in the music video for "Warzone" by The Wanted. In 2012, while being in Milan for Dsquared²'s fashion week, he caught American singer Ciara's attention, who was also there and later asked him star in her music video for "Sorry", which premiered in September of the same year. In 2017, he appeared in an episode of Issa Rae's comedy-drama series Insecure. In 2018, Hunter starred on the sitcoms Marlon and Rel.

Filmography

Films

Television series

Music videos

References

External links
 
 Broderick Hunter at Models.com

1991 births
Living people
American male models
American male television actors
African-American male actors
21st-century American male actors
People from Fontana, California
21st-century African-American people